Bothriocephalus is a genus of flatworms belonging to the family Bothriocephalidae.

The genus has cosmopolitan distribution.

Species:

Bothriocephalus alessandrinii 
Bothriocephalus andresi 
Bothriocephalus angustatus 
Bothriocephalus angusticeps 
Bothriocephalus antarcticus 
Bothriocephalus apogonis 
Bothriocephalus atherinae 
Bothriocephalus auriculatus 
Bothriocephalus australis 
Bothriocephalus barbatus 
Bothriocephalus bengalensis 
Bothriocephalus bifurcatus 
Bothriocephalus brachysoma 
Bothriocephalus bramae 
Bothriocephalus branchiostegi 
Bothriocephalus breviceps 
Bothriocephalus brotulae 
Bothriocephalus capillicollis 
Bothriocephalus carangis 
Bothriocephalus celinae 
Bothriocephalus celineae 
Bothriocephalus cepolae 
Bothriocephalus clavibothrium 
Bothriocephalus claviceps 
Bothriocephalus claviceps 
Bothriocephalus coronatus 
Bothriocephalus cuspidatus 
Bothriocephalus euryciensis 
Bothriocephalus fluviatilis 
Bothriocephalus formosus 
Bothriocephalus funiculus 
Bothriocephalus gadellus 
Bothriocephalus gadi
Bothriocephalus gregarius Renaud Gabrion & Pasteur, 1983
Bothriocephalus hirondellei 
Bothriocephalus infundibuliformis 
Bothriocephalus japonicus 
Bothriocephalus kerguelensis 
Bothriocephalus labracis 
Bothriocephalus lateolabracis 
Bothriocephalus levinseni 
Bothriocephalus lophii 
Bothriocephalus macrobothrium 
Bothriocephalus macrophallus 
Bothriocephalus manubriformis 
Bothriocephalus minutus 
Bothriocephalus monticelli 
Bothriocephalus motellae 
Bothriocephalus nigropunctatus 
Bothriocephalus occidentalis 
Bothriocephalus palumbi 
Bothriocephalus parvus 
Bothriocephalus pearsei 
Bothriocephalus phoxini 
Bothriocephalus rarus 
Bothriocephalus salvelini 
Bothriocephalus sauridae 
Bothriocephalus sciaenae 
Bothriocephalus scorpii 
Bothriocephalus sphaerocephalum 
Bothriocephalus spinachidae 
Bothriocephalus squali 
Bothriocephalus tetragonus 
Bothriocephalus timii 
Bothriocephalus tintinnabulus 
Bothriocephalus trachypteri 
Bothriocephalus trachypteriiris 
Bothriocephalus trachypteriliopteri 
Bothriocephalus travassosi 
Bothriocephalus tumidulus 
Bothriocephalus typhlotritonis 
Bothriocephalus uncinatus 
Bothriocephalus vallei 
Bothriocephalus verticillatus

References

Cestoda
Cestoda genera